Escola Portuguesa Ruy Cinatti – Centro de Ensino e Língua Portuguesa (EPRC-CELP) is a Portuguese international school in Santa Cruz, Dili, East Timor.

It serves levels from preschool through senior high school.

History
The school opened in 2002 as the Escola Portuguesa de Díli. It was later renamed to Escola Portuguesa de Díli – Centro de Ensino e Língua Portuguesa in 2009, and it received its current name during the 2011–2012 school year.

Student body
As of 2015, there are 871 students, with 87.1% being East Timorese, 9.5% being Portuguese, and 3.4% coming from other countries. They are, as of the same year, divided into 35 classes.

References

External links
 Escola Portuguesa Ruy Cinnati

Portuguese international schools in East Timor
Dili
2002 establishments in East Timor
Educational institutions established in 2002